Francesco Robba (1 May 1698 – 24 January 1757) was an Italian sculptor of the Baroque period. Even though he is regarded as the leading Baroque sculptor of marble statuary in southeastern Central Europe, he has remained practically unknown to international scholars.

Life
Francesco Robba was born in Venice. He received his training in the workshop of the Venetian sculptor Pietro Baratta from 1711 to 1716. In 1720, he moved to Ljubljana to work for the Jesuits order. There he married local stonemason's Luka Mislej daughter Theresa in 1722.

In this early period, his first marble statues and reliefs still reflect the influence of Pietro Baratta. When Mislej died in 1727, Robba took over his workshop and his clientele. Soon Robba started to earn his own reputation and was awarded commissions by ecclesiastical, aristocratic and bourgeois patrons. Already in 1729 his work was praised in a letter to Prince Emmerich Esterházy, Archbishop of Esztergom by the rector of the Jesuit College in Zagreb, Francesco Saverio Barci.

From 1727 on his works attest of a growing self-confidence. His technical virtuosity manifests itself in the emotional expressions and the refined forms of his statues. During his stay in Ljubljana, he didn't lose contacts with Venice, since he paid several visits to his native city. This allowed him to remain familiar with the Baroque sculpture of Venice, central Italy and Rome.

The prevailing view has been that in 1755, Robba left Ljubljana for Zagreb, Croatia, where he died on 24 January 1757. According to an article published in 2001 by Blaž Resman, new documents had shown that even though Robba died on a short trip to Zagreb, his residence and his workshop remained in Ljubljana.

Works

The best-known work by Francesco Robba is the Fountain of the Three Rivers of Carniola (1751), representing the Ljubljanica, the Sava and the Krka. It was inspired by the Bernini's Fountain of the Four Rivers on Piazza Navona and by the fountain on Piazza della Rotonda, both in Rome.

Other works include the Narcissus Fountain (Ljubljana), the main altar and the statues (1732) in St. James's Church (Ljubljana), an altar in Ljubljana Cathedral, the majority of the main altar in the Franciscan Church of the Annunciation (Ljubljana), a statue of St. John of Nepomuk in Klagenfurt (Austria) and an altar in the parish church in Vransko. Francesco Robba is also the creator of the main altar of the Ursuline Church of the Holy Trinity in Ljubljana and presumably also of the marble statue of the Holy Trinity Monument that stands in front of it.

The work of Francesco Robba was highlighted in an international scientific symposium, held in Ljubljana in November 1998.

References

Further reading
Francesco Robba and the Venetian Baroque Sculpture of the Eighteenth Century; Rokus Publishing House Ltd., Ljubljana, Slovenia; 
Matej Klemenčič, Francesco Robba (1698–1757). Beneški kipar in arhitekt v baročni Ljubljani, Maribor 2013, 311 pp.

External links

1698 births
1757 deaths
Republic of Venice sculptors
18th-century Italian sculptors
Italian male sculptors
Italian Baroque sculptors
Catholic sculptors
18th-century Italian male artists